Hari Krishna Singh was an Indian politician, Former MLA, Speaker of Madhya Pradesh Legislative Assembly, Indian Freedom Fighter from the state of the Madhya Pradesh.
He represented Berasia Vidhan Sabha constituency of undivided Madhya Pradesh Legislative Assembly by winning General election of 1957.

References 

People from Madhya Pradesh
Madhya Pradesh MLAs 1957–1962
People from Bhopal district
Year of birth missing
Year of death missing
Indian National Congress politicians from Madhya Pradesh